Melissa Batya Cohen Biden (b. circa 1986) is a South African-American activist and documentary filmmaker. Originally from Johannesburg, Biden works as an environmental activist and nature conservationist. She was the co-owner of Tribal Worlds, a Los Angeles-based company that promoted indigenous conservation until it dissolved in 2021. In 2016, she produced the documentary film series Tribal Lands, but the project was cancelled before making it to streaming platforms. In 2019, she became the second wife of Hunter Biden, a son of U.S. President Joe Biden.

Early life and education 
Biden was born in Johannesburg, South Africa. She lived in an orphanage for a year before being adopted by Lee and Zoe Cohen, a South African Jewish couple with three sons. She was raised in the Jewish faith and attended a Jewish day school before studying interior design at Greenside Design Center College of Design. She moved to Los Angeles when she was twenty-one years old to attend a supplementary program in Horticulture at the University of California, Los Angeles.

Career 
Biden is an advocate for environmental and nature conservation groups. She was a member of Greenpeace and is the co-owner of Tribal Worlds, a Los Angeles-based company that promotes indigenous conservation. She has also done activist work against poaching.
 
Biden worked on a documentary titled Tribal Lands, aiming to introduce viewers to indigenous tribal communities in Africa. The project was canceled in 2016 and the film never made it to streaming platforms.

Personal life 
While enrolled at UCLA, she met an American businessman named Jason Lavender, and married him in 2011.

In 2019, she met Hunter Biden, a son of then-former U.S. Vice President and presidential candidate Joe Biden and his first wife, Neilia Hunter Biden. On May 16, 2019, six days after meeting, they married in a ceremony held at her apartment in Los Angeles. Neither's family were present at the ceremony, but the couple called Joe Biden afterwards, and he congratulated them. Their son, Joseph Robinette "Beau" Biden IV -named after Biden's deceased brother Beau- was born in March 2020 in Los Angeles. She is also the stepmother to her husband's three daughters, Naomi, Finnegan, and Maisy, from his first marriage to Kathleen Buhle, as well as an unnamed daughter from Biden's affair with Lunden Alexis Roberts, who gave birth to the child in August 2018 in Arkansas.

She attended the Inauguration of Joe Biden in 2021.

Biden speaks Xhosa, Hebrew, Italian, and English. She and her family live in Little Rock, Malibu, California. In 2019 she became a naturalized citizen of the United States.

References

1980s births
People from Johannesburg
Living people
Melissa
South African emigrants to the United States
South African Jews
South African women environmentalists
South African women film producers
South African adoptees
Jewish American activists
Jewish women activists
California Democrats
Naturalized citizens of the United States
Hunter Biden
University of California, Los Angeles alumni
20th-century South African women
21st-century South African women
20th-century American women
21st-century American women
Date of birth missing (living people)
Year of birth missing (living people)